Miles Airport or Aerodrome  is an airport serving the small towns of Miles and Condamine, and surrounding rural residents in Queensland, Australia.

The aerodrome underwent a major expansion in 2013 to meet the Fly-in fly-out needs of the coal seam gas industry in that region (Coalbed methane), and is capable of taking aircraft with 50 to 74 seats. The runway is 1,067 meters long and 30 meters wide.

See also
 List of airports in Queensland
Western Downs Regional Council
Western Downs Regional Council

References

Airports in Queensland